Mary Walsh is a former camogie player, captain of the All Ireland Camogie Championship winning team in 1937. She won a further All Ireland senior medal in 1938.

References

External links
 Camogie.ie Official Camogie Association Website
 Wikipedia List of Camogie players

Dublin camogie players
Year of birth missing
Possibly living people
UCD camogie players